Raymond Albert "Ray" Speaker,  (born December 13, 1935) is a Canadian farmer and politician. Speaker was born and raised in Enchant, Alberta, where he farms to this day. He was an elected official at the federal and provincial levels for 34 years, and never lost an election.

Provincial politics

A graduate of the University of Alberta, Speaker taught in local schools until 1962. He entered politics in the 1963 provincial election when he was elected as a Member of the Legislative Assembly (MLA) for the Social Credit Party of Alberta from the mostly rural riding of Little Bow. He was named to Ernest Manning's cabinet as minister without portfolio in 1967, becoming Minister of Health and Social Development and Minister of Personnel in 1968.  He also became Chairman of the Human Resources Development Authority in 1969 under Manning's successor, Harry Strom.

He remained a Social Credit MLA for many years after the party lost power in the 1971 election, usually winning handily even as the party's support ebbed away in the rest of the province.  When party leader Robert Curtis Clark returned to the backbench in 1980, a few months after losing the 1979 election, Speaker became parliamentary leader of the party and hence Leader of the Opposition.  However, in 1982, Speaker announced that Social Credit would be sitting out the next provincial election due to dwindling support for the party. A few months earlier, Clark's former seat had been resoundingly lost in a by-election, costing Social Credit official party status.  Speaker's announcement was disavowed by party officials.  A motion to dissolve the party failed.  Soon after the writs were dropped for the election, Speaker and Walt Buck resigned from the party and were reelected as independents.

Denied funding guaranteed to political parties, Speaker and Buck formed a new right-wing party, the Representative Party of Alberta.  It branded itself as a modern version of Social Credit without the social credit monetary policy, and was intended to be a home for former Socreds who had also left what remained of the party.  Speaker was elected its leader.  However, in 1989, Speaker crossed the floor to the Progressive Conservative Association of Alberta. He was reelected with 70 percent of the vote in 1989, his highest total.  Following that election, he was named to the cabinet as Minister of Housing and Urban Affairs.

Speaker was the last surviving member of what would be the last Socred government, as well as the last parliamentary survivor of the Manning and Strom governments.

National politics

Speaker resigned from the Legislative Assembly in 1992 after winning the Reform Party of Canada nomination for the seat of Lethbridge in the House of Commons of Canada. He won handily, and served as finance critic and then House Leader of the Reform caucus. He retired from politics at the 1997 election.

After politics 
In 1999, Speaker was appointed to the Security Intelligence Review Committee, an agency which provides an external review of the Canadian Security Intelligence Service, and was named to the Queen's Privy Council for Canada.

In 2001, he was made an Officer of the Order of Canada.

In 2003, he received an Honorary Doctorate from the University of Lethbridge, Honorary Doctorate of Laws.

After the Conservative Party won a plurality of seats in the 2006 federal election, Speaker was appointed to the Prime Minister's transition team. He also was the chair of the Conservative-Canadian Alliance merger.

He was appointed as a mentor for the Trudeau Foundation of Canada in January 2008.

References

External links
 

 

1935 births
Alberta Social Credit Party MLAs
Independent Alberta MLAs
Canadian Lutherans
Living people
Members of the Executive Council of Alberta
Members of the House of Commons of Canada from Alberta
Members of the King's Privy Council for Canada
Officers of the Order of Canada
Progressive Conservative Association of Alberta MLAs
Reform Party of Canada MPs
Representative Party of Alberta MLAs
20th-century Canadian politicians